Solo is a 2017 Indian experimental anthology film co-written, co-produced and directed by Bejoy Nambiar with Dulquer Salmaan in the lead role. Shot simultaneously in Malayalam and Tamil, production began during November 2016. Solo tells the story of four people, each story revolving around four elements: Earth, Fire, Wind and Water, each with the facets of Lord Shiva. The film was released on 5 October 2017 in both Tamil and Malayalam  worldwide. The film was dubbed in Telugu as Athade, which released on 22 June 2018. It's also dubbed into Hindi as Tatva.

Plot

The film consists of four independent stories, all of which star Dulquer Salmaan as the protagonist: Shekhar, Trilok, Siva and Rudra.

World of Shekhar (Blind Love)

World of Shekhar is based on the Element of Water. It is a love story of a stammering, daring but loving young man named Shekhar and Radhika who is a blind, talented dancer, with an open mind. Their story starts in college, 4 years ago. There is a lot of fuss over whom  Radhika loves, whether it is Shekhar's friend Nelson or a guy named Sanju. Finally, Radhika confesses her love for Shekhar in front of everyone and the poetic love story begins. When their families find out about their relationship, they do not approve. But when Radhika reveals she is pregnant with his child, they agree to the wedding. After celebrating the happiest days of their lives during the wedding, Radhika goes into labour and passes away while delivering their baby. Shekhar, not being able to accept the truth goes out on his bike, only to meet with an accident. However, the story ends with Shekhar playing with their daughter on a beach, thereby, fulfilling a promise made to Radhika to take their daughter to a beach and spends time with her; just as Radhika's father did for her just before she lost her eyesight.

World of Trilok (The Cyclist)
The story begins with Aisha whose cycle collides with a car being driven by Thomas Zachariah. Zachariah's son-in-law Justin decides to save her, but Zachariah declines. Justin puts her in the car anyway and rushes to the hospital, but Aisha dies on the way. Instead of taking the body to the hospital, Zachariah disposes it on the road.

Four years later, Justin and his wife Annie are saddened by the demise of Zachariah. After returning from a business deal, Justin discovers that his car brakes are not working. The car crashes leaving Justin wounded, but he is saved by Dr Trilok Menon, a veterinary surgeon. As Trilok rushes to the hospital with Justin, Justin notices a photo of Aisha in Trilok's car and realizes she was his wife.

After recovering, Justin tells everything to Annie and decides to tell the truth to Trilok. Justin narrates the whole incident. Trilok reveals that it was really him who killed Zachariah, that the accident was orchestrated by him too, and he also injected a drug in Justin's drip a few minutes ago which would make him brain dead. He says he was tracking them all these years and had heard everything that Zachariah and Justin said during the incident through Aisha's BlueTooth earbuds, revealing to him that she was pregnant and was still alive even after they disposed of her. Trilok then exits the room leaving Justin to die.

World of Shiva (Ties of Blood)

Shiva's mother leaves him, his father, and his brother Siddhu. Years later, Shiva is now a gangster working under his mentor Bhadran, a crime boss. Shiva protects his brother and is harsh on his wife Rukku. Siddhu is invited to join the gang by Bhadran, when he is released from prison for almost killing someone in the middle of the college.

Shiva's life changes when his father is found shot in a bar. From the bar's CCTV records, it is revealed that his father was killed by Vishnu, a crime boss in Mumbai and Shiva decides to take revenge. Shiva along with two of his gang members Nandha and Prabha goes to Mumbai. On the bus to Mumbai, Siddhu is found by Nandha and Shiva attempts to throw him out but Nandha allows him to stay. On reaching Mumbai, Shiva joins hands with a gangster to eliminate Vishnu.

The next night Shiva and gang reach Vishnu and start a shootout in a ritual place, which gets Prabha and many others are killed. Shiva eliminates almost every member of Vishnu's gang and Siddhu escapes, and rushing to Shiva only to see him get killed by Vishnu. Siddhu and Nandha manage to escape and reach their hideout. The next morning, revenge and fury filled Siddhu takes Nandha's gun and goes to Vishnu's house, only to be shocked by seeing his mother there who is now Vishnu's wife. It is revealed that this was why Vishnu killed Shiva and his father. As Vishnu enters the room, Siddhu shoots him in the chest and kills him and his mother begs him to escape. The story ends with a grieving Siddhu running through the streets of Mumbai.

World of Rudra (Everything is fair in love and war)

Rudra Ramachandran is an army trainee, madly in love with his girlfriend Akshara. He constantly ruins Akshara's marriage proposals by creating a scene in her house.

Rudra is the son of Brig. Ramachandran and Vidya who always scold him for his aggressive behavior, but his father always considered him a friend. Akshara's father Sundararajan decides to file a case against him in order to expel him from the army as revenge for his aggressive actions, but Rudra's father and mother request him not to. Later, Akshara tells Rudra that she got admission for a degree in Australia and has to leave soon. She promises that she will always be his.

Four years later, Rudra is an army officer narrating the story to his senior officer Col. Raunaq Sachdeva and team. He tells them that Akshara has not contacted him since and when he went to Australia, she refused to see him. He informs them that her marriage has been fixed, but he yearns to know why she became a stranger to him. Raunaq says that his team must never accept defeat and that Rudra must go to her marriage. Rudra along with others go to Akshara's house on the eve of her marriage. Rudra sees her but she refuses to talk to him. That night, Rudra barges in and demands Alok, Akshara's fiancé to fight with him. Alok, a boxing champion, beats up Rudra, but Raunaq motivates him to fight back. Rudra brutally beats up Alok but is hindered by Akshara who tells him that it was really his father who asked her not to be with him. A shocked Rudra leaves the gathering. Later, his mother tells him that his father had an affair with another woman when Rudra was 2 years old and that his parents were on the verge of divorce. Although he ended the affair for the sake of living for Rudra, the woman was pregnant. The woman is revealed to be Akshara's mother which makes Akshara Rudra's half-sister. The film ends with Rudra asking for forgiveness from Alok on the day of his marriage with Akshara.

Cast

Production
In September 2016, Bejoy Nambiar revealed that he was preparing a script for a Malayalam film starring Dulquer Salmaan in the lead role. Nambiar stated that he would also produce the venture under his home studio, Getaway Films, in association with Abaam Movies. The following month, the film was titled as Solo and Nambiar revealed that it would be simultaneously shot and released in Tamil.

The film began production on 14 November 2016 in Kochi, with Chennai-based model Arthi Venkatesh making her debut as a leading actress in the film. The first schedule was completed within ten days, with the team shooting for up to twelve hours a day. Anson Paul and actress Ann Augustine were added to the film to play a couple. Following a production break, the second shooting schedule began in March 2017 in Kochi and then moved to Mumbai, following the completion of Dulquer's filming work for Comrade in America (2017). Actress Sruthi Hariharan joined the project during the second schedule, as did actresses Sai Tamhankar and Asha Jayaram for two further leading female roles. Actors Manoj K. Jayan, Prakash Belawadi and filmmaker Qaushiq Mukherjee also joined the cast during the second schedule, while Govind Menon and Siddharth Menon were signed as the film's music composers along with other composers and also agreed to play musicians in the film. R. Parthiepan also revealed that he had signed to work on the film in a supporting role.

The third schedule for film was started in Kochi during April 2017, with several more additions to the cast. Actress Dhansika was signed to play a leading role of a visually-challenged dancer, while actors Sathish, John Vijay, Sheelu Abraham and Soubin Shahir also joined the team. The team moved to film another segment of the anthology in Lonavala during May 2017 with actors Dino Morea, Neha Sharma and Deepti Sati playing important roles. Nassar and Suhasini also joined the team during the schedule to portray parents of Dulquer's character in the segment.

The animated sequences for the film were created by Plexus, a Mumbai-based motion design and visual effects studio.

Soundtrack

The film's soundtrack has twenty-two songs recorded by an assortment of musicians.

Reception
Times Of India reviewer Deepa Soman rated it 3.5/5 and stated:' An experimental romantic thriller, Solo is the story of four men, their love, rage and afterlife. Through four elements – water, air, fire and earth, they also represent different facets of Lord Siva.

In other websites, the film was criticised for the World Of Shekhar and World Of Rudra being reminiscent of many previous Tamil films. The World Of Trilok and The World Of Shiva was praised, although the critics said that a crime drama like The World Of Shiva should have been made in a different film with more depth.

Baradwaj Rangan of Film Companion South wrote "Primarily, the film is another casualty of making a bilingual. The supporting cast looks off. The tone is all over the place. And the stories look like they belong neither here nor there. "

Dulquer Salmaan was praised for his versatility as a stammering college student, a revenge-seeking restrained doctor, an emotionally affected criminal, and a heart-broken lover.

References

External links
 

2017 films
2010s Malayalam-language films
2010s Tamil-language films
Films scored by Sooraj S. Kurup
Films scored by Masala Coffee
Films shot in Kochi
Indian multilingual films
Indian anthology films
2017 multilingual films
Films directed by Bejoy Nambiar